Thanh Hằng, real name Phạm Thị Thanh Hằng (born 22 July 1983), is a Vietnamese actress and supermodel. She was the most successful Vietnamese model from 2012 to 2019, thus being usually called The First Vedette of the Vietnamese model industry in the 2010s, preceded by Anh Thư.

After winning the Miss Vietnam through pictures (in 2002), Thanh Hang stepped into professional modelling. She was invited to be the judge for the Vietnam's Next Top Model seasons 4, 6, and 7.

Career

2001: Crowning of Miss Model Photogenic.
2004: Her first film that was filmed and also her first film role was in Những cô gái chân dài.In particular, she won the "Best Model 2004".
2005: She representing Vietnam for the Miss Intercontinental contest.
2006: She appeared in her first television drama Tuyết nhiệt đới. In the series: Thanh Hằng played Lam–a young poet, who is moody. For her, a life full of both material and spiritual will bring her a deadlock in the path of poetry. So Lam left to find inspiration for creation, creating waves for her love affair with Hải (Lương Mạnh Hải).
2007: She appeared in the drama Tôi là ngôi sao. In the series: Thanh Hang played two sisters with opposite characters, Khánh Hà and Vân Hà.
2008: She appeared in the drama Gia tài bác sĩ. Thanh Hằng succeeded in becoming the character of Hạnh – a physician dedicated to the profession and played the role of An in the film Kiss of the Death that helped bring her Mai Vang Award for movie actress favourite five.
2010: She became the judge of Mister Vietnam. She also appeared in the film Burning Kisses as Thanh Lam, a goofy but passionate singer and dancer. Thanh Hằng spent a long time practicing dance techniques. She also was invited to become Vietnam's representative at Miss Universe 2010 but refused due to lack of time.
2011: She judged in Siêu mẫu Việt Nam and appeared in the drama Người mẫu. In the drama: Thanh Hang played the role model supermodel and designer Binh Khôi.
2013: Filmed Mỹ nhân kế as Kiều Thị.She judged at the reality television series Vietnam's Next Top Model cycle 4.
2015: She became the judge and presenter of Vietnam's Next Top Model cycle 6 and starred at the film Siêu Nhân X.
2016: She continued to become judges and host of Vietnam's Next Top Model cycle 7 and the female lead in the music video for "Tháng tư là lời nói dối của em" (Hà Anh Tuấn).
2017: Thanh Hang appeared in the film with the role of Ba Trân in Mẹ chồng which marked her return to acting and continue to be the female lead in another music video.

Thanh Hang has participated in Duyên Dáng Việt Nam, Đẹp lên cùng Cẩm nang mua sắm, Thời trang - Cuộc sống on HTV, and many other television programmes.

She also performed in France, India, Singapore, etc.

She is the exclusive model of brands like Aquafina and also many other brands that invite her to model such as Samsung, CLear, etc.

Awards
Miss Model Photogenic 2001
"Excellent model" in 2004-05
Top 15 Miss Intercontinental in 2005
2006 "Best Model" Award
Top 30 medals (all kinds) on the ball sport
Golden Apes for An in Kiss of the Death
"Star of the Year" (Star Newspaper.Net 2013)
HTV Awards "Most Favourite Model 2015"
Wechoice Award (TV Show Judge category)
and many other big and small awards

Filmography

Music videos
"Hãy mặc em đi" – Hồ Ngọc Hà
"Tháng 4 là lời nói dối của em" – Hà Anh Tuấn
"Tái bút anh yêu em" – Hà Anh Tuấn
"Em À" – Hà Anh Tuấn

Short films
The new woman in you

TV series
Tuyết nhiệt đới – as Lam
Tôi là ngôi sao – as Khánh Hà và Vân Hà
Gia tài bác sĩ – as Hạnh
Người mẫu – as Bình Khôi

Films
Những cô gái chân dài (2004) – as Ngọc Mai
Kiss of the Death (2008) – as An
Burning Kisses – as Thanh Lam
Mỹ nhân kế (2013) – as Kiều Thị
Siêu Nhân X (2015) – as Kỳ Kỳ
Mẹ chồng (2017) – as Ba Trân
Tháng năm rực rỡ (2018) – as Mỹ Dung
Chị chị em em (2019) – as Thiên Kim

Discography

Music videos
Ngày mới và em
Xuân hạnh phúc

Songs to series
Nhan sắc
Vào Hạ
Em Vẫn Muốn Yêu Anh – with Hồ Ngọc Hà
Ngày mới
Giấc Mơ Ngôi Sao
Get High

References

External links
 

1983 births
Living people
Vietnamese female models
Vietnamese film actresses
Vietnamese television actresses
People from Da Nang
21st-century Vietnamese women